This is a list of rural localities in Tatarstan. The Republic of Tatarstan is a federal subject of Russia (a republic) located in the Volga Federal District. Its capital is the city of Kazan, which is one of Russia's larger and more prosperous cities. The republic borders with Kirov, Ulyanovsk, Samara, and Orenburg Oblasts, and with the Mari El, Udmurt, and Chuvash Republics, as well as with the Republic of Bashkortostan. The unofficial Tatarstan motto is: Bez Buldırabız! (We can!).

Aktanyshsky District 
Rural localities in Aktanyshsky District:

 Aktanysh
 Staroye Aymanovo

Alkeyevsky District 
Rural localities in Alkeyevsky District:

 Bazarnye Mataki

Almetyevsky District 
Rural localities in Almetyevsky District:

 Abdrakhmanovo

Arsky District 
Rural localities in Arsky District:

 Baykal
 Koshlauch
 Murali
 Uchili

Atninsky District 
Rural localities in Atninsky District:

 Arı
 Ayshiyaz
 Baxtaçı
 Bäxtiyar
 Cilgelde
 Çımbulat
 Çişmäle Sap
 Dusım
 İske Coğıp
 İske Öcem
 İske Mäñgär
 İske Şimber
 Keçe Ätnä
 Külle Kime
 Küäm
 Küñgär
 Küşär
 Mamış
 Märcän
 Möndeş
 Muqşı
 Olı Bäräzä
 Olı Mäñgär
 Olı Öşkätä
 Qayınsar
 Qazaq Ürtäme
 Qışlaw
 Qızıl Utar
 Qomırğuca
 Şäkänäç
 Taşçişmä
 Töreklär
 Tübän Bäräskä
 Tübän Köyek
 Tübän Şaşı
 Yapançı
 Yaña Ätnä
 Yaña Bäräskä
 Yaña Cölbi
 Yaña Öcem
 Yaña Şaşı
 Yaña Şimber
 Yuğarı Köyek
 Yuğarı Särdä
 Yuğarı Şaşı

Cheremshansky District 
Rural localities in Cheremshansky District:

 Cheremshan

Drozhzhanovsky District 
Rural localities in Drozhzhanovsky District:

 Malaya Tsilna
 Staroye Drozhzhanoye

Kamsko-Ustyinsky District 
Rural localities in Kamsko-Ustyinsky District:

 Syukeyevo

Kaybitsky District 
Rural localities in Kaybitsky District:

 Afanas
 Bärlebaşı
 Baymorza
 Bolshiye Kaybitsy
 Bolshoe Podberezye
 Borındıq
 Çükri Alan
 Çüti
 İmänle Bortas
 İske Bua
 İske Tärbit
 Keçe Qaybıç
 Keçe Ursaq
 Mälki
 Morza Bärlebaşı
 Murali
 Olı Tärbit
 Olı Ursaq
 Qamıllı
 Qolañğı
 Qoşman
 Quşkül
 Saltığan
 Sorawıl
 Starye Chechkaby
 Şüşirmä
 Ursaq forestry's settlement
 Xuca Xäsän
 Yaña Bua

Leninogorsky District 
Rural localities in Leninogorsky District:

 Shugurovo

Mamadyshsky District 
Rural localities in Mamadyshsky District:

 Zyuri

Muslyumovsky District 
Rural localities in Muslyumovsky District:

 Muslyumovo

Novosheshminsky District 
Rural localities in Novosheshminsky District:

 Novosheshminsk

Nurlatsky District 
Rural localities in Nurlatsky District:

 Kichkalnya
 Chuvashsky Timerlek

Pestrechinsky District 
Rural localities in Pestrechinsky District:

 Chita
 Lenino-Kokushkino
 Pestretsy
 Shali

Sarmanovsky District 
Rural localities in Sarmanovsky District:

 Sarmanovo

Tyulyachinsky District 
Rural localities in Tyulyachinsky District:

 Tyulyachi

Verkhneuslonsky District 
Rural localities in Verkhneuslonsky District:

 Baqçasaray
 Berek
 Mullanur Waxitof isemendäge
 Nariman
 Qızıl Bayraq
 Studenets
 Tatar Maqılı
 Tatar Mämätxucası
 Verkhny Uslon
 Watan
 Yaña Bolğar
 Yaña Yul
 Yoldız

Vysokogorsky District 
Rural localities in Vysokogorsky District:

 Äblä
 Alan-Bäksär
 Alat
 Äldermeş
 Apsabaş
 Äsän
 Ayaz İle
 Aybaş
 Baykal
 Biektaw
 Biknarat
 Börele
 Börele animal farm settlement
 Çämäk
 Çıpçıq
 Çırşı
 Çuaş İle
 Çubar
 Döbyaz
 İneş
 Keçe Bitaman
 Keçe Qawal
 Keçe Räs
 Keçe Solabaş
 Kinderle
 Külle
 Macar
 Matmır
 Mämdäl
 Naratlıq
 Öbrä
 Ölä
 Olı Bitaman
 Olı Köyek
 Olı Qawal
 Olı Räs
 Olı Solabaş
 Olıyaz
 Ömbe
 Önsä
 Qarakül
 Qayınlıq
 Qazaqlar
 Qodaş
 Qondırlı
 Qorqaçıq
 Qorqaçıq railway junction settlement
 Qızıl Şäreq
 Qızılkül
 Şäpşe
 Saya
 Şiğäli
 Şıpşıyıq
 Suıqsu
 Tatar Ayshase
 Tatar Urmatı
 Taşlı Qawal
 Taşsu
 Tornayaz
 Tuqtamış
 Urmançı
 Urta Alat
 Urıs-Tatar Äyşäse
 Usad
 Yamaşirmä
 Yañawıl
 Yurtış
 Yuwas
 Yäş Köç
 Zheleznodorozhnoy stantsii Vysokaya Gora

Zelenodolsky District 
Rural localities in Zelenodolsky District:

 Gruzinsky
 Sviyazhsk

See also
 
 Lists of rural localities in Russia

References

Tatarstan